Stella Creek is a narrow winding passage extending from Thumb Rock to the southeast end of Winter Island and lying between Winter Island and Galindez Island in the Argentine Islands, Wilhelm Archipelago. Charted in 1935 by the British Graham Land Expedition (BGLE) and named after the expedition motor boat Stella Polaris.

Straits of the Wilhelm Archipelago